Porcellio flavocinctus is a species of woodlouse in the genus Porcellio belonging to the family Porcellionidae that can be found on islands like Crete, Cyclades, Cyprus, Dodecanese, Malta, North Aegean, and Sicily. It can also be found in such western European countries as Portugal and Spain.

References

Crustaceans described in 1879
Woodlice of Europe
Porcellionidae